Portrait of Charles V or Portrait of a Man Wearing the Order of the Golden Fleece is a c. 1533-1535 oil on canvas painting by Titian, now in the Museo di Capodimonte in Naples.

History
It is one of many works the artists painted in that period showing Charles V, Holy Roman Emperor, with domains in Spain, Italy and the Americas. No sources definitively date the work, meaning that it is instead dated on the basis of research in various surviving archival documents. According to Vasari's Lives of the Artists, Titian's first painting of Charles was made in 1530, showing him in armour holding a commander's baton. This is confirmed by a letter dated 18 March 1530 from Giacomo Leonardi, ambassador of the Duke of Urbino to the Republic of Venice. All trace of that painting is now lost, though it appears in 17th century collection inventories. Other sources refer to a three-quarter-length portrait mentioned on 15 October 1542, when Alessandro Farnese the Younger wrote thanking the papal nuncio Fabio Mignanelli, then still in Venice, for sending him a portrait of Charles V. 

On 20 August 1563 another letter from Alessandro tells Onofrio Panvinio, then working on the iconography for the Villa Farnese in Caprarola, the work of Taddeo Zuccari, to ask the ambassador in Venice to send him a portrait of Charles as the basis for Charles' portrayal in the frescoes. This may be the same work mentioned in 1534 letters between ambassador don Lope de Soria and Charles' secretary Francisco de los Cobos, which mention two paintings of the king which Titian was producing simultaneously. Another theory argues the work originated in the Gonzaga collection after being sent to Ferrante by Titian himself in 1549, though this theory is now not widely supported since no documents survive to show how the work might have moved from the Gonzaga to the Farnese collection.

The earliest definitive sources on the work date to the mid 17th century when - now moved from Rome to Parma - the work's subject was lost and it was retitled Portrait of a Philosopher, Portrait of a Man in Black or Portrait of Ferdinand I (Charles's younger brother). In Parma it was also misattributed to Girolamo Mazzola. It moved to Naples in 1734 with the rest of the Farnese Collection when it was inherited by Charles III of Spain after the death of the last Farnese Elisabetta, upon which the original attribution was restored. A long restoration in the 20th century re-identified Charles as the work's subject.

References

Bibliography
 AA. VV., I Farnese. Arte e collezionismo, Milano, Editrice Electa, 1995, ISBN 978-8843551323.
 AA. VV., Tiziano e il ritratto di corte da Raffaello ai Carracci, Napoli, Editrice Electa, 2006, ISBN 978-8851003364.

Farnese Collection
1530s paintings
Charles V
Charles V
Paintings in the collection of the Museo di Capodimonte